The 2011 Al Habtoor Tennis Challenge was a professional tennis tournament played on hard courts. It was the tenth edition of the tournament which was part of the 2011 ITF Women's Circuit. It took place in Dubai, United Arab Emirates between 28 November to 3 December.

WTA entrants

Seeds

 1 Rankings are as of November 21, 2011.

Other entrants
The following players received wildcards into the singles main draw:
  Fatma Al-Nabhani
  Darija Jurak
  Conny Perrin
  Emily Webley-Smith

The following players received entry from the qualifying draw:
  Nigina Abduraimova
  Nastja Kolar
  Tara Moore
  Jasmina Tinjić

Champions

Singles

 Noppawan Lertcheewakarn def.  Kristina Mladenovic, 7–5, 6–4

Doubles

 Nina Bratchikova /  Darija Jurak def.  Akgul Amanmuradova /  Alexandra Dulgheru, 6–4, 3–6, [10–6]

External links
Official Website
ITF Search 

Al Habtoor Tennis Challenge
Al Habtoor Tennis Challenge
2011 in Emirati tennis